William Michael Hardy Spicer, Baron Spicer,  (22 January 1943 – 29 May 2019) was a British politician and life peer who was a Conservative member of the House of Lords from 2010 until 2019. He served as Member of Parliament for West Worcestershire from 1974 to 2010 and was a minister from 1984 to 1990. He later served as chairman of the 1922 Committee from 2001 to 2010.

Early life
He was born in Bath, Somerset, to Lt. Col. (later Brigadier) L. Hardy Spicer and Muriel, daughter of Wallis G. Carter of Bath. Spicer was educated in Vienna, at Gaunts House Preparatory School and Wellington College, and received a degree in economics from Emmanuel College, Cambridge. After graduation, he worked as a financial journalist for The Statist, the Daily Mail and The Sunday Times. He was Director of Conservative Systems Research Centre from 1968 to 1970, and managing director of Economic Models Ltd from 1970 to 1980.

Parliamentary career
Spicer joined the Conservative Party, and at the 1966 general election, he challenged Manny Shinwell in the safe Labour Easington constituency as the youngest parliamentary candidate in the country against the eldest. He stood in Easington again at the 1970 general election before he was elected at the February 1974 general election for South Worcestershire. He represented South Worcestershire until 1997. When boundary changes abolished the constituency; he then moved to the West Worcestershire seat, which he represented until his retirement from the Commons.

After the 1979 general election, which swept the Conservatives to power, he became a Parliamentary Private Secretary at the Department of Trade. He was later made a Deputy Chairman of the Conservative Party. He became a Parliamentary Under-Secretary of State at the Department of Transport in 1984 and served until 1987 with specific responsibility for aviation.

In 1987, he moved to the Department of Energy, again as a Parliamentary Under-Secretary, this time with responsibility for electricity and coal. In January 1990, he was promoted to become a Minister of State at the Department of the Environment, but after the ousting of Margaret Thatcher in November 1990, he left the government payroll over his opposition to British participation in the European Exchange Rate Mechanism.

On leaving the government, he became the chairman of the Parliamentary and Scientific Committee in the House of Commons. In 1993, he founded the eurosceptic European Research Group within the Conservative Party.
In the 1996 New Year Honours he received a knighthood, with the honour conferred by Queen Elizabeth II on 13 February 1996. After the 1997 general election he became a member of the Treasury Select Committee.

He was an author and had a number of books published, including The Spicer Diaries.

His majority declined in 1997 in keeping with the general trend across the country, but he kept his seat which had become West Worcestershire after boundary changes that year. His majority almost doubled four years later, at the 2001 general election. However, unlike most other Conservative MPs, he failed to increase his majority in 2005; instead, it was more than halved, and he held one of the Conservatives' most marginal seats against the Liberal Democrats, who had a 'decapitation' strategy.

After the 2001 general election, Spicer was elected Chairman of the 1922 Committee, a position that he held until he stood down in 2010.

As chairman of the 1922 Committee, he had the distinction of presiding over more leadership elections than any of his predecessors since Iain Duncan Smith, Michael Howard and David Cameron were all elected during his tenure. This record has now been surpassed by Graham Brady.

In the Commons, he became known for asking short questions, usually of one-sentence questions to government ministers and at Prime Minister's Questions and once simply asking Gordon Brown, "Will the Prime Minister confirm that he will soldier on to the bitter end?" On another occasion, he asked Brown, "Why are there always so many strikes at the end of a Labour government?"

On 26 March 2006, Spicer announced that he would not contest the Worcestershire West seat at the 2010 election and that he would retire as an MP.

Later life
He was created a life peer on 8 July 2010 as Baron Spicer, of Cropthorne in the County of Worcestershire.

He was sworn of the Privy Council on 15 May 2013 at Buckingham Palace; as a peer, he acquired the post-nominal letters "PC" for life.

Death
Spicer died in the Royal Borough of Kensington and Chelsea, London, from complications of Parkinson's disease and leukaemia on 29 May 2019.

References

External links
 Sir Michael Spicer MP official site
 Guardian Unlimited Politics – Ask Aristotle: Sir Michael Spicer MP
 TheyWorkForYou.com – Michael Spicer MP
 
 Ministerial Posts
 BBC Politics page

News items
 Elected Chairman of 1922 committee in 2001

1943 births
2019 deaths
Alumni of Emmanuel College, Cambridge
British Eurosceptics
Conservative Party (UK) life peers
Conservative Party (UK) MPs for English constituencies
Deaths from leukemia
Deaths from Parkinson's disease
Neurological disease deaths in the United Kingdom
Deaths from cancer in the United Kingdom
Members of the Privy Council of the United Kingdom
People educated at Wellington College, Berkshire
People from Bath, Somerset
UK MPs 1974
UK MPs 1974–1979
UK MPs 1979–1983
UK MPs 1983–1987
UK MPs 1987–1992
UK MPs 1992–1997
UK MPs 1997–2001
UK MPs 2001–2005
UK MPs 2005–2010
Life peers created by Elizabeth II
Knights Bachelor
Politicians awarded knighthoods